The Drosophilidae are a diverse, cosmopolitan family of flies, which includes species called fruit flies, although they are more accurately referred to as vinegar or pomace flies. Another distantly related family of flies, Tephritidae, are true fruit flies because they are frugivorous, and include apple maggot flies and many pests. The best known species of the Drosophilidae is Drosophila melanogaster, within the genus Drosophila, also called the "fruit fly." Drosophila melanogaster is used extensively for studies concerning genetics, development, physiology, ecology and behaviour. Many fundamental biological mechanisms were discovered first in D. melanogaster. The fruit fly is mostly composed of post-mitotic cells, has a very short lifespan, and shows gradual aging. As in other species, temperature influences the life history of the animal. Several genes have been identified that can be manipulated to extend the lifespan of these insects. Additionally, Drosophila subobscura, also within the genus Drosophila, has been reputed as a model organism for evolutionary-biological studies, along with D. sechellia for the evolution of host specialization on the toxic noni fruit and Scaptomyza flava for the evolution of herbivory and specialist on toxic mustard leaves.

Economic significance 
Generally, drosophilids are considered to be nuisance flies rather than pests, since most species breed in rotting material. Zaprionus indianus is unusual among Drosophilidae species in being a serious, primary pest of at least one commercial fruit, figs in Brazil. Another species, Drosophila suzukii, infests thin-skinned fruit such as raspberries and cherries and can be a serious agricultural pest. The leaf mining Scaptomyza flava, which is nested in the genus Drosophila phylogenetically, is an obligate leaf miner of mustard plants, including the model plant Arabidopsis thaliana and is a major pest of salad brassicas in New Zealand and an emerging pest of canola in the UK. Drosophila repleta larvae inhabit drains and spread bacteria. Fruit flies in general are considered as a common vector in propagating acetic acid bacteria in nature. This often ruins the alcohol fermentation process and can ruin beer or wine by turning it into vinegar. There are sinking traps available on the market for this nuisance, but one quick way to strongly limit the extent of it is to vacuum clean the flies both at rest and in their slow flight.

Identification 
The diagnostic characteristics for Drosophilidae include the presence of an incomplete subcostal vein, two breaks in the costal vein, a small anal cell in the wing, convergent postocellar bristles; and usually three frontal bristles on each side of the head, one directed forward and the other two directed rearward. More extensive identification characteristics can be found in "Drosophila: A Guide to Species Identification and Use" by Therese A. Markow and Patrick O'Grady, (Academic Press, 2005)  or "Drosophila: A Laboratory Handbook" by M. Ashburner, K. Golic, S. Hawley, (Cold Spring Harbor Laboratory Press, 2005).

Anti-parasitic behavior 

Of their many defenses against parasites, when Drosophila melanogaster flies see female larval endoparasitoid wasps, they switch to laying their eggs in alcohol-laden food sources such as rotting fruit. Doing so protects the flies from becoming host to the larvae, as the wasps have a low alcohol tolerance.  This oviposition behavior change only occurs upon seeing the female wasp larva and does not take place in the presence of the male wasp larva.

Mutualism 
There is evidence to support that pathogens living within certain flies are beneficial to the behavior and survival of the host. One such example of this is in the fly Scaptomyza flava, which carries the pathogen Pseudomonas syringae in exchange for the pathogen damaging the anti-herbivore defenses of main food source for the fly, plants in the family Brassicaceae.

Phylogeny 
The family contains more than 4,000 species classified under 75 genera. Recently, a comprehensive phylogenetic classification of the genera based on both molecular and morphological characters has been published.
 Subfamily Drosophilinae Rondani, 1856:
 Tribe Colocasiomyini Okada, 1989:
 Genus Baeodrosophila Wheeler & Takada, 1964
 Genus Balara Bock, 1982
 Genus Chymomyza Czerny, 1903
 Genus Colocasiomyia de Meijere, 1914
 Genus Lissocephala Malloch, 1929
 Genus Neotanygastrella Duda, 1925
 Genus Phorticella Duda, 1924
 Genus Scaptodrosophila Duda, 1923
 Genus Protochymomyza Grimaldi, 1987
 Tribe Drosophilini Okada, 1989:
 Genus Arengomyia Yafuso & Toda, 2008
 Genus Bialba Bock, 1989
 Genus Calodrosophila Wheeler & Takada, 1964
 Genus Celidosoma Hardy, 1965
 Genus Collessia Bock, 1982
 Genus Dettopsomyia Lamb, 1914
 Genus Dichaetophora Duda, 1940
 Genus Dicladochaeta Malloch, 1932
 Genus Drosophila Fallén, 1823
 Genus Hirtodrosophila Duda, 1923
 Genus Hypselothyrea Okada, 1956
 Genus Idiomyia Grimshaw, 1901 (Hawaiian Drosophila)
 Genus Jeannelopsis Séguy, 1938
 Genus Laccodrosophila Duda, 1927
 Genus Liodrosophila Duda, 1922
 Genus Lordiphosa Basden, 1961
 Genus Microdrosophila Malloch, 1921
 Genus Miomyia Grimaldi, 1987
 Genus Mulgravea Bock, 1982
 Genus Mycodrosophila Oldenberg, 1914
 Genus Palmomyia Grimaldi, 2003
 Genus Paraliodrosophila Duda, 1925
 Genus Paramycodrosophila Duda, 1924
 Genus Poliocephala Bock, 1989
 Genus Samoaia Malloch, 1934
 Genus Scaptomyza Hardy, 1849
 Genus Sphaerogastrella Duda, 1922
 Genus Styloptera Duda, 1924
 Genus Tambourella Wheeler, 1957
 Genus Zaprionus Coquillett, 1902
 Genus Zaropunis Tsacas, 1990
 Genus Zapriothrica Wheeler, 1956
 Genus Zygothrica Wiedemann, 1830
 Incertae sedis:
 Genus Marquesia Malloch, 1932
 Subfamily Steganinae Hendel, 1917:
 Tribe Gitonini Grimaldi, 1990:
 Genus Allopygaea Tsacas, 2000
 Genus Acletoxenus Frauenfeld, 1868
 Genus Amiota Loew, 1862
 Genus Apenthecia Tsacas, 1983
 Genus Apsiphortica Okada, 1971
 Genus Cacoxenus Loew, 1858
 Genus Crincosia Bock, 1982
 Genus Electrophortica Hennig, 1965
 Genus Erima Kertész, 1899
 Genus Gitona Meigen, 1830
 Genus Hyalistata Wheeler, 1960
 Genus Luzonimyia Malloch, 1926
 Genus Mayagueza Wheeler, 1960
 Genus Paracacoxenus Hardy & Wheeler, 1960
 Genus Paraleucophenga Hendel, 1914
 Genus Paraphortica Duda, 1934
 Genus Phortica Schiner, 1862
 Genus Pseudiastata Coquillett, 1901
 Genus Pseudocacoxenus Duda, 1925
 Genus Rhinoleucophenga Hendel, 1917
 Genus Soederbomia Hendel, 1938
 Genus Trachyleucophenga Hendel, 1917
 Tribe Steganini Okada, 1989:
 Genus Eostegana Hendel, 1913
 Genus Leucophenga Mik, 1866
 Genus Pararhinoleucophenga Duda, 1924
 Genus Parastegana Okada, 1971
 Genus Pseudostegana Okada, 1978
 Genus Stegana Meigen, 1830
 Incertae sedis:
 Genus Neorhinoleucophenga Duda, 1924
 Genus Pyrgometopa Kertész, 1901

References

External links 

 Diptera.info photo gallery
Family Drosophilidae at EOL images

 
Brachycera families
Taxa named by Camillo Rondani